Mika Helkearo (born October 4, 1960) is a retired professional ice hockey player. He was born in Forssa, Finland.

Helkearo is best known from his tenure in Finnish First Division team FPS where he posted 817 points in 580 First Division games.

Helkearo's records are being considered virtually unbreakable and he holds the records for most Mestis/1. Divisioona games, most Mestis/1. Divisioona assists and most Mestis/1. Divisioona points as Håkan Hjerpe, the only one who is even close to Helkearo's numbers has the record for most Mestis/1. Divisioona goals (317 goals).

Cause of this, Helkearo is called "Divarin Gretzky", Gretzky of the First Division, as a nod to famous National Hockey League player Wayne Gretzky, who has big numbers on his all-time stats for NHL.

Helkearo also played in the top league of Finland, the SM-liiga where he played two seasons for HIFK, 1981–82 and 1982–83, one season for HPK, 1983–84 and a single game for Jokerit in 1993–94 season.

Helkearo retired in 1996. Helkearo was 36 years of age when he retired.

Helkearo's Jersey number 15 has been retired by FPS.

Career statistics

References

1960 births
Living people
People from Forssa
FoPS players
Jokerit players
HIFK (ice hockey) players
HPK players
Finnish ice hockey forwards
Sportspeople from Kanta-Häme